The Lockheed XV-4 Hummingbird (originally designated VZ-10) was a U.S. Army project to demonstrate the feasibility of using VTOL for a surveillance aircraft carrying target-acquisition and sensory equipment. It was designed and built by the Lockheed Corporation in the 1960s, one of many attempts to produce a V/STOL vertical take off/landing jet. Both prototype aircraft were destroyed in accidents.

Design and development
Vertical take-off lift was obtained by exhausting the engine flow downward through multiple nozzles, augmented by a secondary flow of cold air. But the performance was far below estimates with only a 1.04 thrust-to-weight ratio, and the prototype crashed on 10 June 1964, killing the pilot. The second aircraft was converted to lift jets instead, yet also crashed after several tests.

Rockwell's XFV-12 would be even less successful at producing lift by using engine exhaust to entrain cold air, in this case through flaps on the wings.

None of the early American V/STOL designs would result in a production aircraft. The British Hawker Siddeley Harrier used vectoring nozzles, while the Russian Yakovlev Yak-38 Forger attack jet used lift jets in conjunction with rotating rear nozzles. The Lockheed F-35 Lightning II would later employ a shaft-driven lift fan located in the fuselage.

Testing

The first conventional takeoff flight of the first prototype, XV-4A (62–4503), took place on 7 July 1962. Initial tethered flight tests were carried out on 30 November 1962 with the first free hovering flight occurring on 24 May 1963. The first flight to transition from hovering to forward flight took place on 8 November 1963. 62–4503 was destroyed in a fatal crash in Cobb County on 10 June 1964.

Lockheed modified the second prototype aircraft between 1966 and 1968 to XV-4B standard. The two Pratt & Whitney JT12 engines were replaced with six General Electric J85 turbojets, four of these units acting as lift jets. This aircraft crashed in Georgia on 14 March 1969; pilot Harlan J. Quamme escaped uninjured, using the ejection seat.

Variants

 XV-4A:
 XV-4B:

Specifications (XV-4A)

See also

Notes

References
 X-Planes and Prototypes by Jim Winchester

External links

 VSTOL.org Wheel

V-004
1960s United States experimental aircraft
Twinjets
Aircraft with auxiliary jet engines
Lift jet
Cancelled military aircraft projects of the United States
Mid-wing aircraft
Aircraft first flown in 1962
T-tail aircraft